Ponmanai is a panchayat town in Kanniyakumari district in the Indian state of Tamil Nadu.

Demographics
 India census, Ponmanai had a population of 13,553. Males constitute 50% of the population and females 50%. Ponmanai has an average literacy rate of 76%, higher than the national average of 59.5%: male literacy is 78%, and female literacy is 74%. In Ponmanai, 10% of the population is under 6 years of age. Thimbileshwarar Temple(5th shivalaya),a Hindu Temple dedicated to Lord Shiva is located here,
Chaakku swami temple (ponmanai to valiyatumugam road )(5th to 6th shivalaya route)also located here.

References

Cities and towns in Kanyakumari district